Coppin or Coppins may refer to;

People
 Daniel Coppin (1771–1822), British artist and art collector
 Fanny Jackson Coppin (1837–1913), African-American educator and missionary
 George Coppin (1819–1906), actor and politician in Australia
 Jean Coppin (c. 1615–c. 1690), French traveller and professional soldier
 Johnny Coppin, English singer/songwriter, composer and broadcaster 
 Levi Coppin, (1848-1924), American bishop
 M. E. Thompson Coppin (c. 1878–1940), African-American physician
 Richard Coppin, 17th-century English political and religious writer
Coppins
 Frederick George Coppins (1889–1963), Canadian recipient of the Victoria Cross

Fictional people
 Tahnee Coppin, in the Australian soap opera Neighbours, played by Anna Jennings-Edquist
 Taj Coppin, in the Australian soap opera Neighbours, played by Jaime Robbie Reyne

Places
 Coppin State University, historically black college in Baltimore, Maryland
 Coppin Academy High School, public high school in Baltimore, Maryland
 Coppin Center, multi-purpose arena in Baltimore, Maryland
 Coppin Heights, Baltimore, a neighborhood in the western part of Baltimore, Maryland
 Coppins, farmhouse in Buckinghamshire, England, used by the royal family